V 105 Cremon was a German trawler built in 1922 which was converted into a Vorpostenboot for the Kriegsmarine during World War II.

Description
The engine was built by Reiherstieg Schiffswerfte & Maschinenfabrik A. G., Hamburg, Germany. It was rated at 54nhp, driving a single screw propeller.

History 
Cremon was a fishing trawler built by Reiherstieg Schiffswerfte & Maschinenfabrik A.G., Hamburg in 1922 for the Deutsche Hochsee-fischerei Bremen-Cuxhaven. Her port of registry was Cuxhaven and the Code Letters RDGJ were allocated. In 1934, her Code Letters were changed to DHEM.

Cremon was requistioned by the Kriegsmarine on 1 October 1939. She served as an auxiliary patrol boat during the early years of World War II in the 1 Vorpostenflotille, specifically serving off Norway immediately after the German invasion there. During the invasion, Norwegian minelayers frantically mined the harbors that German ships would soon occupy. One of these minelayers, laid over twenty mines between Lerøy Island and Sotra and around Vatlestraumen. Since no minesweepers were available in the area, the two support vessels  and Cremon were outfitted in mine clearing gear and sent to clear the area of mines. Schiff 9 struck a mine and sank in less than two minutes, and when Cremon moved to rescue survivors she too struck a mine and exploded. Around six of her crew were killed, five survived.

References 

1922 ships
Ships built in Hamburg
Fishing vessels of Germany
Steamships of Germany
World War II merchant ships of Germany
Auxiliary ships of the Kriegsmarine
Maritime incidents in April 1940